The Bookman was a monthly magazine published in London from 1891 until 1934 by Hodder & Stoughton. It was a catalogue of the current publications that also contained reviews, advertising and illustrations. William Robertson Nicoll, Arthur St. John Adcock and Hugh Ross Williamson were editors. Contributors included G. K. Chesterton, Walter Pater, Gertrude Atherton, Guy Thorne, J. M. Barrie, Edward Thomas, W.B. Yeats, Arthur Ransome, M.R. James and Samuel Beckett.

References

External links

Defunct literary magazines published in the United Kingdom
Monthly magazines published in the United Kingdom
Magazines established in 1891
Magazines disestablished in 1934
Magazines published in London
Book review magazines